The Jaghjagh River ( Nahr Jaqjaq,  Nahr al-Jaghjagh, or Nahr al-Hirmas,  Nahro dJaqjaq) is a tributary of the Khabur River in Turkey and Syria.

The river was known in ancient Greek as the Mygdonius, and lent its name to the city of Antioch in Mygdonia.

Sources 
The river has two sources.  The longer branch, known as Siyahsu (meaning dark water, Kurdish Av-e Resh), rises near the village of Toptepe in Mardin Province, Turkey, and flows 10 km to the confluence with the shorter branch, known as Beyazsu (meaning white water, Kurdish Av-e Spi).

Course 
The river crosses into Syria near the cities of Nusaybin and Qamishli.  The water is heavily used for irrigation, in both Turkey and Syria. The river flows into the Khabur River at Al-Hasakah.

Wildlife 
Freshwater mussels and turtles live in the river.  Trout are also raised commercially.

References

External links 
 Confluence of Siyahsu and beyazsu, Google Maps
 Source of Beyazsu, Google Maps
 Source of Siyahsu, Google Maps

Rivers of Syria
Rivers of Turkey
Landforms of Mardin Province
Tributaries of the Khabur (Euphrates)
International rivers of Asia